Republican can refer to:

Political ideology
 An advocate of a republic, a type of government that is not a monarchy or dictatorship, and is usually associated with the rule of law.
 Republicanism, the ideology in support of republics or against monarchy; the opposite of monarchism
Republicanism in Australia
Republicanism in Barbados
Republicanism in Canada
Republicanism in Ireland
Republicanism in Morocco
Republicanism in the Netherlands
Republicanism in New Zealand
Republicanism in Spain
Republicanism in Sweden
Republicanism in the United Kingdom
Republicanism in the United States
Classical republicanism, republicanism as formulated in the Renaissance
A member of a Republican Party:
Republican Party (disambiguation)
Republican Party (United States), one of the two main parties in the U.S.
Fianna Fáil, a conservative political party in Ireland
The Republicans (France), the main centre-right political party in France
Republican People's Party (disambiguation)
particular governments that called themselves republics, including:
List of republics
Roman Republic, as well as supporters of the Republic during the Roman Empire
Second Spanish Republic, during the Spanish Civil War, as well as its supporters
 Republican faction (Spanish Civil War)
Various French Republics, most notably the First Republic established during the French Revolution and the Second Republic, the first post-Revolution republic in France

People
Upper Republican, a distinct culture of Native Americans along the upper Republican River

Publications
The Republican, a British newspaper established as Sherwin's Political Register by Richard Carlile in 1817 and renamed in 1819
The Republican (Springfield, Massachusetts), a newspaper published in Springfield, Massachusetts
Lawrence Republican, a defunct newspaper published before the American Civil War in Lawrence, Kansas
Missouri Republican, newspaper based in St. Louis, Missouri (1808–1919)
Woodville Republican, a weekly newspaper published in Woodville, Mississippi

Places in the United States
Republican City, Nebraska, a village in the state of Nebraska
Republican River, a river that flows through Colorado, Nebraska, and Kansas

See also

 Republic (disambiguation)
 Republicain (disambiguation)
 Republican Movement (disambiguation)
 Republican Union (disambiguation)
 Republican Party (disambiguation)
 Republican People's Party (disambiguation)
 The Republicans (disambiguation)